Ticket to L.A. is the second studio album by American country music singer Brett Young. It was released on December 7, 2018, through Big Machine Label Group. Its lead single, "Here Tonight" (co-written by Charles Kelley of the group Lady Antebellum), was released in September 2018. The track listing for the album was released on September 10, 2018.

Background
The album is Young's second album released under the Big Machine label. Young co-wrote ten of the album's thirteen tracks. The album was produced by Dann Huff, with engineer Justin Niebank and executive producer Jimmy Harnen.  Collaborators on the album include Gavin DeGraw, Ashley Gorley, Shane McAnally, Hillary Lindsey, Charles Kelley and Ross Copperman.  The first song written for the album is "Used to Missin' You" he co-wrote with Jimmy Robbins and Jon Nite, which was intended for his previous album Brett Young.  He wrote "Chapters" with Gavin Degraw, who wanted the song to be about Young's story. This album has a lighter feel than the previous album, although it ended with a sombre ballad "Don't Wanna Write This Song", which is intended to mirror "Mercy" of that album.

Commercial performance
Ticket to L.A. debuted at number one on Billboard Top Country Albums and number 15 on the US Billboard 200, selling 27,000 copies (37,000 in equivalent album units) in the first week. As of February 2020, the album has sold 75,900 copies in the United States.

Track listing

Personnel
Adapted from liner notes

Ben Caver – background vocals (all tracks except 5 & 6)
Ross Copperman - programming (tracks 3, 9)
Zach Crowell - programming (tracks 1, 12)
Gavin DeGraw – piano (track 9), duet vocals (track 9)
Charles Dixon – viola (track 13), violin (track 13)
Justin Ebach – programming (track 4)
Paul Franklin – steel guitar (tracks 3-6, 8, 10, 12)
Nick Gold – cello (track 13)
Sara Haze - background vocals (track 12) 
Dann Huff – bouzouki (track 1), dobro (track 3), electric slide guitar (track 3), 12-string guitar (tracks 3, 10), electric guitar (all tracks), gut string guitar (tracks 5, 10), Hammond B-3 organ (track 7), keyboards (track 2), little guitar (track 3), mandolin (tracks 1, 3), mandocello (track 1), piano (tracks 8, 11), programming (tracks 1, 2, 4, 7, 10), soloist (tracks 2-4, 6, 7, 10, 11), synthesizer (track 7)
David Huff - programming (all tracks)
Charlie Judge – keyboards (all tracks except 8 & 11), programming (tracks 1-3, 5-9, 13), string arrangements (track 13), strings (tracks 3, 8), synthesizer (track 8)
Noah Needleman – background vocals (track 5)
Jerry Roe - drums (tracks 1, 11)
Jimmy Robbins - programming (track 11)
Jimmie Lee Sloas – bass guitar (all tracks)
Aaron Sterling – drums (all tracks except 1 & 11)
Russell Terrell – background vocals (track 6)
Ilya Toshinsky – banjo (tracks 4, 10, 12), 12-string acoustic guitar (track 1), acoustic guitar (all tracks), ganjo (track 7), hi-string acoustic guitar (track 2), mandolin (track 7)
Derek Wells – baritone guitar (track 13), electric guitar (all tracks), slide guitar (track 1)
Brett Young – lead vocals (all tracks)

Charts

Weekly charts

Year-end charts

References

2018 albums
Brett Young (singer) albums
Big Machine Records albums
Albums produced by Dann Huff